Manit may refer to:

People
 Manit Joura, Indian actor
 Manit Noywech (born 1980), Thai football player
 Manit Rastogi, co-founder of Morphogenesis (architecture firm)
 Manit Sriwanichpoom (born 1961), Thai artist

Other
 Maulana Azad National Institute of Technology